Novgorod Oblast is a federal subject of Russia (an oblast). Its administrative center is the city of Veliky Novgorod. Some of the oldest Russian cities, including Veliky Novgorod and Staraya Russa, are located in the oblast. The historic monuments of Veliky Novgorod and surroundings have been declared a UNESCO World Heritage Site. Population: 634,111 (2010 Census).

Geography

Novgorod Oblast borders with Leningrad Oblast in the north and in the northwest, Vologda Oblast in the east, Tver Oblast in the southeast and in the south, and Pskov Oblast in the southwest.

The western part is a lowland around Lake Ilmen, while the eastern part is a highland (northern spurs of the Valdai Hills). The highest point is Mount Ryzhokha in the Valdai Hills. In the center of the oblast is Lake Ilmen, one of the largest lakes in Central Russia. The major tributaries of Lake Ilmen are the Msta, which originates in the east of the Valdai Hills and collects the rivers in the east of the oblast, the Lovat, the Pola, and the Polist, which all flow to the lake from the south, and the Shelon, flowing from the southwest. The only outflow of the lake is the Volkhov, a major tributary of Lake Ladoga. Almost all of the oblast belongs to the river basin of the Volkhov. The exceptions are the northwest, which belongs to the river basin of the Luga, a tributary of the Baltic Sea, the north, belonging to the basin of the Syas, another tributary of Lake Ladoga, the east, which belongs to the basin of the Mologa, a tributary of the Volga, and the south, belonging to basins of various tributaries of the upper Volga River. Sorted by the discharge, the biggest rivers of the oblast are the Volkhov, the Mologa, the Msta, the Lovat, the Syas, and the Shelon.

The south and the southeast of the oblast contain one of the largest lake districts in European Russia. The biggest lake in the area, Lake Seliger, is divided between Novgorod and Tver Oblasts. Other big lakes in the area include Lake Valdayskoye, Lake Shlino, Lake Velyo, Lake Piros, and Lake Meglino.

Two areas in Novgorod Oblast have been designated as protected natural areas of federal significance. These are Valdaysky National Park in the southeast of the oblast, protecting the lake district and related ecosystems and cultural landscapes, and Rdeysky Nature Reserve in the southwest of the oblast, which protects the Polist-Lovat Swamp System and is adjacent to Polistovsky Nature Reserve in Pskov Oblast.

History

Novgorod is one of the oldest centers of Russian civilization. It lay on the historical trade route from the Varangians to the Greeks, which followed the Volkhov upstream to Lake Ilmen and then followed the course of the Lovat before eventually reaching the Dnieper River. Novgorod is indicated in the chronicles as the site where Rurik settled and founded the Rurik Dynasty in 862. Subsequently, Rurik's successor, Oleg, moved the capital to Kiev, but Novgorod continued to play an important role until the 15th century. In 1136, Novgorod evicted the prince and became the center of the Novgorod Republic, which included the major part of what is currently northwestern Russia. It was an example of a medieval republic, in which decisions were taken by veche—a meeting of the city population—and the prince was elected. (The only other Russian city with a similar organization was Pskov.) Novgorod linked the river routes of Baltic, Byzantium, Central Asian regions, and all parts of European Russia and flourished as one of the most important trading centres of eastern and northern Europe.  It was part of the Hanseatic League which connected it to Central and Northern Europe. Novgorod was one of the few areas of Rus not affected by the Mongol invasions. It was also an important cultural center, and the majority of monuments preserved in Russia from the 11th through the 14th century are those standing in Veliky Novgorod.

Towards the end of the 15th century Novgorod was defeated by the army of Ivan III, the prince of Moscow, and was included into the Grand Duchy of Moscow. In 1560, Ivan the Terrible, fearing treason, sent his army to sack the city. This event, known as the Massacre of Novgorod, had catastrophic consequences for the city, which lost the majority of its population and never recovered.  Additionally, in the beginning of the 17th century, during the Time of Troubles, Novgorod was plundered by the Swedish army.

, 1708 Tsar Peter the Great issued an edict which established seven governorates. The present area of Novgorod oblast was a part of Ingermanland Governorate, which was renamed Saint Petersburg Governorate in 1710. In 1727, a separate Novgorod Governorate was established. It was subdivided into five provinces, and the current area of Novgorod Oblast was split between two of them—Novgorod and Velikiye Luki Provinces. In 1772, Velikiye Luki Province was transferred to newly established Pskov Governorate. In 1775, Novgorod Governorate was transformed to Novgorod Viceroyalty, and in 1777, Pskov Governorate was transformed to Pskov Viceroyalty. In 1796, both governorates were re-established. By the 1920s, most of the area of current Novgorod Oblast belonged to Novgorod Governorate.

Before the 19th century, the areas around Novgorod were considerably better developed than the areas which are currently located in the center and the east of the oblast. In 1851, Moscow – Saint Petersburg Railway, the first long-distance railway in Russia, opened. It bypassed Novgorod as it was built on a straight line between Moscow and Saint Petersburg. The railway construction lead to the development of the adjacent areas and eventually to creation of new towns such as Malaya Vishera, Okulovka, and Chudovo. Later on, the railroads between Sonkovo and Saint Petersburg, as well as between Bologoye and Pskov, and a number of connecting lines, were constructed.

On August 1, 1927 the governorates were abolished, and merged into newly established Leningrad Oblast. Between autumn of 1941 and spring of 1944, during World War II, western parts of the current area of Novgorod Oblast, including the city of Novgorod, were occupied by German troops. Novgorod Oblast was an area of long and fierce battles, such as, for example, the Demyansk Pocket, or the Leningrad–Novgorod Offensive in 1944, when the Soviet troops crossed the Volkhov River. After the liberation, on July 5, 1944, Novgorod Oblast with the center in the city of Novgorod was established.

In 1999, the city of Novgorod was renamed Veliky Novgorod.

Politics

During the Soviet period, the high authority in the oblast was shared between three persons: The first secretary of the Novgorod CPSU Committee (who in reality had the biggest authority), the chairman of the oblast Soviet (legislative power), and the Chairman of the oblast Executive Committee (executive power). Since 1991, CPSU lost all the power, and the head of the Oblast administration, and eventually the governor was appointed/elected alongside elected regional parliament.

The Charter of Novgorod Oblast is the fundamental law of the region. The Legislative Assembly of Novgorod Oblast is the province's standing legislative (representative) body. The Legislative Assembly exercises its authority by passing laws, resolutions, and other legal acts and by supervising the implementation and observance of the laws and other legal acts passed by it. The highest executive body is the Oblast Government, which includes territorial executive bodies such as district administrations, committees, and commissions that facilitate development and run the day to day matters of the province. The Oblast administration supports the activities of the Governor who is the highest official and acts as guarantor of the observance of the oblast Charter in accordance with the Constitution of Russia.

First secretaries of the Novgorod Oblast CPSU Committee
In the period when they were the most important authority in the oblast (1944 to 1991), the following first secretaries were appointed:
1944–1948 Grigory Kharitonovich Bumagin
1948–1951 Mikhail Nikolayevich Tupitsyn
1951–1954 Alexander Grigoryevich Fyodorov
1954–1956 Terenty Fomich Shtykov
1956–1958 Tikhon Ivanovich Sokolov
1958–1961 Vasily Andreyevich Prokofyev
1961–1972 Vladimir Nikolayevich Bazovsky
1972–1986 Nikolay Afanasyevich Antonov
1986–1991 Ivan Ivanovich Nikulin

Governors
Since 1991, governors were sometimes appointed, and sometimes elected:
1991–2007 Mikhail Mikhaylovich Prusak, head of the administration, appointed; then governor, elected
2007–2017 Sergey Gerasimovich Mitin, governor, appointed, then elected
2017–present Andrei Nikitin (acting), appointed in 2017, then elected

Economy

Industry
As of 2014, industry was responsible for about 40% of the GNP of the oblast. The main industrial enterprises in the oblast are four chemical plants, all located in Veliky Novgorod and specializing mostly in production of fertilizers, a metallurgical plant, also in Veliky Novgorod, producing copper, and a plant in Borovichi producing refractory materials.

Agriculture
The main specialization of agriculture in the oblast is cattle breeding with meat and milk production. In 2011, approximately 90% of the farms held cattle, and 79% of all agricultural production in the oblast were meat, milk, and eggs. A number of large-scale farms are keeping pigs and poultry. Bee-keeping, as well as cultivating of crops and potatoes, are also present.

Transportation

Novgorod appeared as a site on one of the most important Middle-Age trade routes. The importance of waterways has considerably diminished since those days, but Lake Ilmen, the Volkhov River, and lower courses of main tributaries of lake Ilmen—the Lovat, the Msta, the Polist, and the Shelon, as well as Lake Seliger, remain navigable.

The Saint Petersburg – Moscow Railway crosses the oblast from southeast to northwest. The major train stations are Okulovka, Malaya Vishera, and Chudovo. In Chudovo, one railroad branches off south to Veliky Novgorod, and another one north to Volkhovstroy and eventually to Murmansk. Another railway line, connecting Sonkovo and Mga, runs parallel to the first one north of it. A line between Okulovka and Nebolchi makes a connection between the two. Additionally, Veliky Novgorod is connected by railway to Saint Petersburg and Luga. A railway crosses the south of the oblast as well, connecting Bologoye and Pskov via Parfino and Staraya Russa.

The Kushaverskoye peat narrow gauge railway for hauling peat operates in the Khvoyninsky District, and Tyosovo peat narrow gauge railway for hauling peat operates in the Novgorodsky District.

The road network is well developed within the oblast, though only a small number of roads cross borders with Tver Oblast west of Valday and Leningrad Oblast east of Lyubytino. One highway of federal significance, M10, which connects Moscow and Saint Petersburg, crosses the oblast, running through Valday, Kresttsy, and Veliky Novgorod (there is a bypass of Veliky Novgorod). Highways connect Veliky Novgorod with Pskov and with Velikiye Luki, among other destinations.

Novgorod Airport and Krechevitsy Airport are both located around Veliky Novgorod, however, there are no regular passenger flights. Novgorod Airport is basically abandoned.

Administrative divisions

The oblast is administratively divided into three cities and towns under the oblast's jurisdiction (Veliky Novgorod, Borovichi, and Staraya Russa) and twenty-one districts. Another seven towns (Chudovo, Kholm, Malaya Vishera, Okulovka, Pestovo, Soltsy, and Valday) have the status of the towns of district significance.

Demographics
Population: 634,111 (2010 Census), down from 694,355 recorded by the 2002 Census, and further down from about 753,054 recorded in the 1989 Census.

Novgorod Oblast has the lowest population for any oblast in the European part of Russia. One of the reasons for the relatively low population density, particularly the male population, is that the area suffered heavily during World War II. The population is 70.6% urban.

Ethnic groups: Novgorod Oblast is relatively homogenous, with only five recognized ethnic groups of more than two thousand persons each at the time of the 2010 Census. In the 2010 Census, the following ethnicities were most numerous: 560,280 Russians (95.1%); 7,025 Ukrainians (1.2%); 3,438 Belarusians (0.6%); 3,598 Romani (0.6%); 15,054 others. Additionally, 44,716 people were registered from administrative databases, and could not declare an ethnicity. It is estimated that the proportion of ethnicities in this group is the same as that of the declared group.

Vital statistics for 2012
Births: 7 480 (11.9 per 1000)
Deaths: 11 226 (17.9 per 1000)
Total fertility rate:
2009: 1.54 | 2010: 1.55 | 2011: 1.56 | 2012: 1.70 | 2013: 1.70 | 2014: 1.75 | 2015: 1.78 | 2016: 1.80(e)

Religion

According to a 2012 survey 46.8% of the population of Novgorod Oblast adheres to the Russian Orthodox Church, 4% are unaffiliated generic Christians, 1% are Muslims. In addition, 34% of the population declares to be "spiritual but not religious", 10% is atheist, and 3.9% follows other religions or did not give an answer to the question.

Culture and recreation
Novgorod is one of the oldest Russian cities and was an important part of the Old Rus. Like many Russian cities Novgorod preserved its own local characteristics of traditional Russian culture. Despite great damages, in particular, during World War II, a large amount of medieval monuments of art, archeology, and architecture survive. Many of those are included into the World Heritage site Historic Monuments of Novgorod and Surroundings. The majority of them are operated by the Novgorod Museum Reserve. The Saint Sophia Cathedral in Novgorod is the oldest Christian church in Russia with the exception of the Caucasus area. Since Novgorod was not affected by the Mongol invasions, it keeps a fair share of pre-Mongol buildings, most of which are concentrated in the city of Veliky Novgorod and its immediate surroundings. The only pre-Mongol building in Novgorod Oblast outside the Veliky Novgorod agglomeration is the Katholikon of the Transfiguration Cathedral in Staraya Russa, built in the end of the 12th century. Novgorod has, furthermore, a large number of architectural monuments constructed in the 13th–14th centuries, of which the Church of the Transfiguration on Ilyina Street is a representative example.

Novgorod developed a distinct school of icon painting, which considerably affected not only the nearby Pskov and the Northern Russia which was dependent on Novgorod, but also in general the old Russian painting. The oldest survived Novgorod icons are dated by the 12th century. Theophanes the Greek, one of the most notable old Russian artists, spent a part of his life in Novgorod, creating, in particular, frescoes in the Church of the Transfiguration on Ilyina Street. The East Slavic instrument Gusli was first recorded in the north Russian regions around the era of Novgorodian Rus'. The oldest Onion domes which became a popular feature of Russian culture and architecture originated among other regions also in Veliky Novgorod.

The archaeological excavations in Novgorod and Staraya Russa unearthed over a thousand of birch bark manuscripts, used mostly to document various business issues. Currently, these manuscripts serve as the main source on the everyday life in the ancient Russia. Many medieval chronicles originate from Novgorod, the first one being the Novgorod First Chronicle, which covers the period between 1016 and 1471. In 14th century the Slavic-Nordic pirates Ushkuiniks spread in the Russian north and later in many other regions of ancient Russia.

After Novgorod was subordinated to Moscow in the end of the 15th century, its cultural significance gradually diminished. However, Valday Iversky Monastery, founded in the 17th century, served as a major cultural center, and in the 18th–19th centuries many important figures of Russian history owned estates in Novgorod Governorate. For example, generalissimo Alexander Suvorov, a Russian military commander notable for military operations against the Ottoman Empire and against the army of Napoleon in the late 18th century, owned the estate of Konchansko-Suvorovskoye, currently in Borovichsky District, and authors Gleb Uspensky and Nikolay Nekrasov owned summer houses in and near Chudovo. In 1862, the Millennium of Russia monument was erected in Novgorod to commemorate the thousand years of Rurik arrival to Novgorod.

References

Citations

General sources

External links

 
 Information for tourists 
 Central Eurasian Information Resource: Images of Novgorod Oblast—University of Washington Digital Collections

 
States and territories established in 1944